Novonikolayevka is a rural locality (a village) in Konstantinogradovsky Selsoviet, Sterlitamaksky District, Bashkortostan, Russia. The population was 6 as of 2010. There is 1 street.

Geography 
Novonikolayevka is located 38 km northwest of Sterlitamak (the district's administrative centre) by road. Begenyash is the nearest rural locality.

References 

Rural localities in Sterlitamaksky District